Ashley Herring Blake is an American author of children's fiction, best known for her Stonewall Honor Book Award-winning middle grade debut Ivy Aberdeen's Letter to the World and Girl Made of Stars.

Personal life 
She enrolled in college as a voice major, but changed it before the first semester. Blake has a master's degree from Berry College. Prior to becoming an author, Blake worked as a bookseller, teacher, and ABA therapist. She lives in Nashville, Tennessee, with her family. She is openly bisexual.

Selected works 
In 2019, her middle grade debut Ivy Aberdeen's Letter to the World, about a 12-year-old who is struggling with her attraction to girls in the wake of a natural catastrophe, was chosen as a Stonewall Honor Book. Her third young adult novel Girl Made of Stars, about a bisexual teen whose brother gets accused of having raped her best friend, was a finalist for a Lambda Literary Award.

Bibliography 
Young Adult
 Suffer Love (HMH, 2016)
 How to Make a Wish (HMH, 2017)
 Girl Made of Stars (HMH, 2018)
 Hazel Bly and the Deep Blue Sea (Little, Brown Books for Young Readers, 2021)

Middle Grade
 Ivy Aberdeen's Letter to the World (Little, Brown Books for Young Readers, 2018)
 The Mighty Heart of Sunny St. James  (Little, Brown Books for Young Readers, 2019)

Bright Falls series
 Delilah Green Doesn't Care (Berkley Books, 2022)
 Astrid Parker Doesn't Fail (Berkley Books, 2022)

Awards 
Won

Stonewall Honor Book in Children's and Young Adult Literature for Ivy Aberdeen's Letter to the World

Finalist

Lambda Literary Award for LGBTQ Children's/Young for Girl Made of Stars

References 

Living people
21st-century American novelists
Year of birth missing (living people)
Berry College alumni
American women novelists
21st-century American women writers
American writers of young adult literature
Women writers of young adult literature
21st-century LGBT people
American bisexual writers